Harry Edward Dearden  (born 7 May 1997) is an English cricketer. He made his first-class debut for Leicestershire on 12 September 2016 in the 2016 County Championship. He made his List A debut for Leicestershire in the 2018 Royal London One-Day Cup on 7 June 2018. He made his Twenty20 debut for Leicestershire in the 2018 t20 Blast on 17 August 2018.

References

External links
 

1997 births
Living people
Cheshire cricketers
Cricketers from Bury, Greater Manchester
English cricketers
Leicestershire cricketers